Here's Some Love is the sixth studio album by American country music singer Tanya Tucker. It was released on September 6, 1976, by MCA Records, and hit #1 on Billboard's Hot Country LPs chart (Tucker's first). The album was produced by Jerry Crutchfield and contains Tucker's sixth No. 1 single, "Here's Some Love".

Critical reception

The review published in the September 18, 1976 issue of Billboard said, "Excellent offering from Tucker who continues to broaden her appeal beyond the boundaries of country. Titled after her present hot single, the LP displays Tucker at her best, giving a good ride to several strong songs. Jerry Crutchfield's production is on the mark and he has combined an unusual assemblage of musicians—from Johnny Christopher to Mylon LeFevre—to provide an impressive instrumental and vocal background. Material varies from Tony Joe White's "The Gospel Singer" to David Gates' "I Use the Soap". Well balanced in material and talent, the album should move the young Tucker another giant step forward in her career. "Short Cut" indicates an almost jazzy side of Tucker with her warbling and the flute work." The review noted "Here's Some Love", "Comin' Home Alone", "Holding On", "The Gospel Singer", "I Use the Soap", and "Take Me to Heaven" as the best tracks on the album. It also included a note to record dealers which called the album "Tucker's closest approach to a crossover LP" and said that it "might generate some pop action as well as strong country sales."

The review in the September 18, 1976 issue of Cashbox said, "Reflecting a maturity of delivery, Tanya offers this slice of life with a definite feel for the so-called pop audience. Opening with the title song, which is Tanya's current hit single, each selection is tailored as a separate entity. Some are familiar, done in Tanya’s own style, others are newcomers, but the total is a superb package for anyone’s taste."

Commercial performance
The album peaked at No. 1 on the US Billboard Hot Country LPs chart.

The album's first single, "Here's Some Love", was released in July 1976 and peaked at No. 1 on the US Billboard Hot Country Singles chart, No. 82 on the US Billboard Hot 100 chart, and No. 25 on the US Billboard Easy Listening chart. It peaked at No. 2 in Canada on the RPM Country Singles chart, No. 91 on the RPM Top Singles chart, and No. 33 on the RPM Adult Contemporary Singles chart. The second single, "Short Cut", was released in November 1976 and failed to chart. However, its B-side, "Ridin' Rainbows", a non-album track, received enough airplay that the label switched it to the A-side in December 1976 and it became the title track of Tucker's next album.

Track listing
Standard edition

Japan edition

Personnel
Tanya Tucker - lead vocals
Billy Sanford, Steve Gibson - electric and acoustic guitar
Glenn Keener, Johnny Christopher - acoustic guitar
Jack Williams - bass
Bobby Ogdin, Shane Keister - keyboards
Jerry Carrigan, Larrie Londin - drums
Charlie McCoy - harmonica, congas
Billy Puett - flute
Christine Lakeland, Greg Gordon, Janie Fricke, Mylon LeFevre, Sheri Kramer - backing vocals
The Nashville Strings - strings
Bergen White - arrangements, vocals

Charts
Album

Singles

References

1976 albums
Tanya Tucker albums
MCA Records albums
Albums produced by Jerry Crutchfield